Palma Intermodal Station is the main railway station of Palma on the island of Majorca, Spain. It is located at the Plaça d'Espanya in the centre of the city and is also known as Palma Plaça d'Espanya.

Overview
The facility was officially opened 1 March 2007, which is the "Day of the Balearic Islands", a local public holiday which celebrates the islands' autonomy. The Metro commenced operation 25 April 2007.

The station is fully accessible for persons with reduced mobility. Car parking and bicycle racks are available.

Services
Trains of Serveis Ferroviaris de Mallorca and the Palma Metro both use the station. The Ferrocarril de Sóller station is on the other side of the street.

Gallery

See also
Majorca rail network
Ferrocarril de Sóller

References

External links

Palma Intermodal Station
 EMT Palma

Railway stations in the Balearic Islands
Palma Metro stations
Railway stations in Spain opened in 2007